The city of Multan, Punjab, Pakistan has many mausoleums and shrines, due to its rich heritage of pirs and saints. Some of the best-known mausoleums that can still be visited today include the following.

Mausoleum of Baha-ud-Din Zakaria

At the north-eastern fringe of the ancient fort of Multan is the mausoleums of Al-Sheikh Al-Kabir Sheikh-ul-Islam Makhdoom Baha-ud-Din Abu Muhammad Zakaria Al-Qureshi Al-Hashemi, one of the greatest saints of the Suhrawardiyya Silsila (Sufi order or tariqa and one of the most distinguished disciples of Sheikh Al-Shuyukh Shahab al-Din Suhrawardi. He was the founder of Suhrawardiyya Silsila in the Indian subcontinent.

Sheikh Baha-ud-Din Zakariya, known as Bahawal Haq, was born at Kot Karor (Karor Lal Esan), a town of Layyah District near Multan, around 1170. For 30 years, he traveled to different cities in order to preach Islam and eventually settled in Multan in 1222. He died in 1267. Above this is an octagon, about half the height of the square, which is surmounted by a hemispherical dome. The Mausoleum was almost completely ruined during the siege of Multan by the British in 1848, but was soon afterwards restored.

Tomb of Shah Rukn-e-Alam

The tomb of Shah Rukn-e-Alam, grandson of Shaikh Bahauddin Zakaria, which was built between 1320 and 1324, is an unmatched pre-Moghul masterpiece. The Mausoleum of Rukn-i-Alam could possibly be considered the glory of Multan.

This dome is the Shrine of Sheikh Rukn-ud-Din Abul Fath commonly known by the title Rukn-i-Alam ("pillar of the world"). The tomb is located on the southwest side of the Fort. The whole is topped by a hemispherical dome of  external diameter. As it stands on the high ground, the total height above the road level is 150 feet.

Besides its religious importance, the mausoleum is also of considerable archaeological value as its dome is reputed to be the second largest in the world, after Gol gumbad of Bijapur (India), which is the largest. The mausoleum is built entirely of red brick, bounded with beams of shisham wood, which have now turned black after so many centuries. The whole of the exterior is elaborately ornamented with glazed tile panels, string courses and battlements. Colors used are dark blue, azure, and white, contrasted with the deep red of the finely polished bricks. The tomb was said to have been built by Ghias-ud-Din Tughlak for himself, but was given up by his son Muhammad Tughlak in favour of Rukn-i-Alam, when he died in 1330.

Shamsuddin Sabzwari Multani

The mausoleum of Shamsuddin Sabzwari Multani ibn Pir Sayed Salahuddin is located about half a mile to the east of the Fort site, on the high bank of the old bed of the Ravi River near Aam Khas Garden. Sabzwari was born in 1165. He died in 1276 and the shrine was built by his grandson in 1330. The tomb is square,  in height surmounted by a hemispherical dome. It is decorated with ornamental glazed tiles.

Mausoleum of Shah Gardez
Within the city of Multan there is a shrine of Muhammad Shah Yusaf Gardezi, commonly known as Shah Gardez, just inside the Bohar Gate. It is a rectangular domeless building decorated with glazed tiles. Shah Gardez came to Multan in 1088 and revitalized the then-moribund city. Shah Yousaf Gardez converted many people to Islam. His descendants are known as Gardezis and are one of the few old noble families in the country.

Mausoleum of Musa Pak Shaheed
The Mausoleum of Syed Musa Pak Shaheed is inside the Pak Gate. Shaikh Abul Hassab Musa Pak Shaheed was a descendant of Abdul Qadir Jillani and was born in Uch.

Mausoleum of Hafiz Muhammad Jamal Multani
The mausoleum is situated near Aam Khas garden outside Daulat Gate, Multan. The tomb has been built within a wall resembling a fortification. The tomb lies on a platform of marble and is surrounded by an area paved with marble and black slate. On the North and West side there is an arched corridor which looks like a tunnel. On the south side there is an extensive assembly hall, whose timber roof is embellished with decorative work.

Hafiz Jamal died at the age of 66 on 5 Jamadi ul Sani 1226 (7 May 1811). A chronogram for the date of his death was derived by his beloved pupil Munshi Ghulam Hassan from these words of Holy Qur'an: "innl muttaqin fi jannat". Two other chronograms in Persian verses are also inscribed over the eastern gate of the tomb. Hafiz Jamal married twice and one of his wives was from Laang family. He had a considerable number of spiritual successors such as Khwaja Khuda Bakhsh of Khairpur Tamiwali.

Hafiz Jamal was a poet in Arabic, Persian and Saraiki. His "Seeharfi" is a poem in Saraiki which comprises 29 stanzas of four rhyming lines each, the fourth containing the poet's name 'Jamal'. In this Hafiz Jamal uses the spinning wheel and its appurtenances as symbols of deeds and character.

Mausoleum of Shah Ali Akbar
Shah Ali Akbar was a descendant of Shah Shams Sabzwari. He was the grandson of Shah Shams. His mausoleum is situated in Shia Miani Multan.

Other mausoleums and tombs
In addition to the tombs mentioned above, Multan has several other historical and archaeological remains of the Muslim period. Prominent among these are:

 Shahadna Shahaid is located near Delhi Gate and is the shrine of a faithful disciple of 'Bahaul Haq'.
 The mausoleum of Bibi Pak Daman is located near Basti Daira.
 Mausoleum of Sher Shah Syed is on Multan-Mazzaffargarh Road.
 Mausoleum of Makhdoom Abdul Rashid Haqqani at Makhdoom Rashid Road.
 Totla Mai near Haram Gate.
 Baba Safra near Eidgah.

The long brick tombs generally known as Nuagaza tombs, or the "nineyarder tombs". This term is generally applied in the sub-continent to the warriors and martyrs of Islam who fell in action against the Hindus at the time of the early invasions of the Muslims.

It is called Manka. People say the saint wore it round his neck, while some maintain that it was his thumb ring. The tomb is asserted to be 1300 years old. It is possible that it may belong to the times of the early Muslim invasion under Mohammad bin Qasim.

Chisht Nagar is a Shrine of a great saint Maulana Ghulam Rabbani Ramdasi Chishti Sabri(1918–1988) near Jahanian Mandi, Multan.

See also
 List of mausolea
 List of mausolea and shrines in Pakistan
 List of cemeteries
 List of cemeteries in Pakistan

References

External links 
 Images from Multan

.

Mausoleums in Pakistan
Tourist attractions in Multan
Shrines in Pakistan